Siekierzyce  (German: Seckerwitz) is a village in the administrative district of Gmina Mściwojów, within Jawor County, Lower Silesian Voivodeship, in south-western Poland. It is around 3 km south-east of the town of Jawor, and 55 km from the city of Wroclaw.

It has a cold and temperate climate with significant rainfall, and precipitation during the driest month.

There is a rail service for both passengers and freight. It is within a short drive from the historic Gross-Rosen concentration camp.

History

In the years 1975-1998 the town administratively belonged to the province of Legnica .
Prior to 1945, Siekierzyce was in Germany.

References

Siekierzyce